Kamalov is a Turkic, Russian and Ukrainian surname. Notable people with the surname include:

Gadzhimurat Kamalov, (1965–2011), Russian investigative journalist
Olim Kamalov (born 1960), Tajik painter
Rafik Kamalov (died 2006), Kyrgyzstani imam

Russian-language surnames
Turkic-language surnames
Patronymic surnames
Surnames from given names